Macanal is a town and municipality in the Colombian Department of Boyacá, part of the subregion of the Neira Province. It borders Campohermoso in the east, Almeida in the west, Garagoa in the north and in the south Santa María and Chivor.

Etymology 
The name Macanal is either derived from the Chibcha word Macana, meaning garrote, or from the Macana palm tree (Wettinia kalbreyeri).

History 
The area of Macanal was part of the Muisca Confederation, a loose confederation of different rulers of the Muisca. The zaque of Hunza ruled over Macanal.

Modern Macanal was founded on May 4, 1807.

Geology 
The Macanal Formation, an organic shale, outcrops near and has been named after Macanal.

Economy 
Main economical activities of Macanal are agriculture; coffee (Coffea arabica), bananas, maize, beans (Phaseolus vulgaris), yuca, sugarcane (Saccharum officinarum), arracacha (Arracacia xanthorrhiza), avocadoes, papayas, mangoes, guayaba and cucumbers (Cucumis sativus and Cyclanthera pedata), livestock farming and mining (gypsum and emeralds).

Gallery

References 

Municipalities of Boyacá Department
1807 establishments in the Spanish Empire
Populated places established in 1807
Muisca Confederation